The 1938 Pontypridd by-election was held on 11 February 1938.  The by-election was held due to the death of the incumbent Labour MP, David Lewis Davies.  It was won by the Labour candidate Arthur Pearson.

References

1930s in Glamorgan
1938 in Wales
1930s elections in Wales
Politics of Glamorgan
1938 elections in the United Kingdom
By-elections to the Parliament of the United Kingdom in Welsh constituencies